Tony Ongarello (22 December 1932 – 18 July 2022) was an Australian rules footballer of Italian heritage who played with Fitzroy in the VFL from 1952 to 1960. He played most of his career at full-forward.

Ongarello is believed to be the last player in the VFL/AFL to have scored a goal from a place kick, scoring two goals from the kicks late in Fitzroy's narrow loss to Geelong in 1955 at Brunswick Street Oval. He was also the last player to attempt a place kick. Ongarello reportedly switched to the place kicks after missing several consecutive set shots from punt kicks in the game.

He appeared regularly on ABC television Australian rules football panels in Victoria in the 1960s and 1970s.

Notes

External links

1932 births
2022 deaths
Australian rules footballers from Victoria (Australia)
Fitzroy Football Club players
Australian people of Italian descent
Australian Rules footballers: place kick exponents